The following is a list of Sites of Special Scientific Interest in the North Lochaber  Area of Search; for South Lochaber see List of SSSIs in South Lochaber. For SSSIs elsewhere in Scotland, see List of SSSIs by Area of Search.

 Ach an Todhair
 Ardgour Pinewoods
 Ben Alder And Aonach Beag
 Ben Nevis
 Blar na Caillich Buidhe
 Coille Phuiteachain
 Creag Meagaidh
 Druimindarroch
 Garry Falls
 Glen Barisdale
 Glen Beasdale
 Leven Valley
 Loch Arkaig Pinewood
 Loch Dubh
 Loch Morar
 Loch Shiel
 Lochailort
 Lon Leanachain
 Mallaig Coast
 Parallel Roads of Lochaber
 Quoich Spillway
 Rannoch Lochs
 South Laggan Fen

 
North Lochaber